Cyperus vorsteri is a sedge of the family Cyperaceae native to southern Africa.

Description
The plant flowers in spring, between August and November. Following flowering it will form a dark yellow-brown trigonous nut with a narrow-obovoid to narrow-ellipsoid shape.

Taxonomy
The species was originally described as Mariscus grantii by the botanist Charles Baron Clarke in 1898 as part of the Thiselton-Dyer work Cyperaceae. Flora Capensis. It was subsequently reclassified into the genus Cyperus in 1994 by Karen Wilson in the work New taxa and combinations in the family Cyperaceae in eastern Australia published in the journal Telopea.

Distribution
The species is endemic to South Africa. 
It has been introduced in Western Australia where it is found along streams and creeks in Kalamunda in the outer metropolitan region of Perth where it grows in sandy-clay soils. 
It has also become naturalised in areas in and around Sydney where it is often found in disturbed areas of woodland and parks.

See also
List of Cyperus species

References

Plants described in 1898
Flora of Western Australia
Flora of South Africa
Flora of New South Wales
vorsteri
Taxa named by Karen Louise Wilson